Tserents (born Hovsep Shishmanian, (September 16 (28), 1822 – February 1 (13), 1888), was a prominent Armenian writer.

Biography 
Tserents/Dzerents studied at Venice, at the San Lazzaro degli Armeni of the Mekhitarist Order between 1831–1837 and continued his education in Paris (1848–1853). He returned to Constantinople in 1853 and lived for several years in Cyprus, working as a teacher and a scientist. Among with his daughter he moved to Tiflis in 1878, and worked as a teacher in the Nersisyan Armenian gymnasium. During that period as a doctor he visited Van, Alashkert, Basean and other towns of Western Armenia.

He is buried at the Armenian Pantheon of Tbilisi.

Works 
Together with Raffi, Tserents was the founder of the Armenian historical novel. The novel Thoros of Levon (1877) was dedicated to the tragic events in the history of the Armenian Kingdom of Cilicia in the 12th century. His best known novel, The Travails of the 9th Century (1879), reflects the liberation struggle of the Armenian people against the Abbasid Caliphate in the 9th century. Tserents' novel Theodoros Rshtuni (1881) is about the historic struggle of the 7th century for a strong centralized state.

References

 Great Soviet encyclopedia, 3d edition. – Moscow, 1970–77.
 English translation of Toros, Son of Levon, Travails of the 9th Century, and Theodoros Rshtuni. 
 Jennifer Manoukian, "Hovsep Shishmanian (Dzerents)," Encyclopedia of Romantic Nationalism in Europe: Encyclopedia of Romantic Nationalism in Europe | Public Interface

1822 births
1888 deaths
Writers from Istanbul
Armenians from the Ottoman Empire
Armenian-language writers
19th-century writers from the Ottoman Empire
Burials at Armenian Pantheon of Tbilisi
San Lazzaro degli Armeni alumni
Emigrants from the Ottoman Empire to the Russian Empire